In Internet activism, hacktivism, or hactivism (a portmanteau of hack and activism), is the use of computer-based techniques such as hacking as a form of civil disobedience to promote a political agenda or social change. With roots in hacker culture and hacker ethics, its ends are often related to free speech, human rights, or freedom of information movements.

Hacktivist activities span many political ideals and issues. Freenet, a peer-to-peer platform for censorship-resistant communication, is a prime example of translating political thought and freedom of speech into code. Hacking as a form of activism can be carried out through a network of activists, such as Anonymous and WikiLeaks, or through a singular activist, working in collaboration toward common goals without an overarching authority figure.

"Hacktivism" is a controversial term with several meanings. The word was coined to characterize electronic direct action as working toward social change by combining programming skills with critical thinking. But just as hack can sometimes mean cyber crime, hacktivism can be used to mean activism that is malicious, destructive, and undermining the security of the Internet as a technical, economic, and political platform.

According to the United States 2020-2022 Counterintelligence Strategy, in addition to state adversaries and transnational criminal organizations, "ideologically motivated entities such as hacktivists, leaktivists, and public disclosure organizations, also pose significant threats".

Origins and definitions 
Writer Jason Sack first used the term hacktivism in a 1995 article in conceptualizing New Media artist Shu Lea Cheang's film Fresh Kill. However, the term is frequently attributed to the Cult of the Dead Cow (cDc) member "Omega," who used it in a 1996 e-mail to the group. Due to the variety of meanings of its root words, the definition of hacktivism is nebulous and there exists significant disagreement over the kinds of activities and purposes it encompasses. Some definitions include acts of cyberterrorism while others simply reaffirm the use of technological hacking to effect social change.

Forms and methods
Self-proclaimed "hacktivists" often work anonymously, sometimes operating in groups while other times operating as a lone wolf with several cyber-personas all corresponding to one activist within the cyberactivism umbrella that has been gaining public interest and power in pop-culture. Hacktivists generally operate under apolitical ideals and express uninhibited ideas or abuse without being scrutinized by society while representing or defending themselves publicly under an anonymous identity giving them a sense of power in the cyberactivism community.

In order to carry out their operations, hacktivists might create new tools; or integrate or use a variety of software tools readily available on the Internet. One class of hacktivist activities includes increasing the accessibility of others to take politically motivated action online.

Repertoire of contention of hacktivism includes among others:

 Code: Software and websites can achieve political goals. For example, the encryption software PGP can be used to secure communications; PGP's author, Phil Zimmermann said he distributed it first to the peace movement. Jim Warren suggests PGP's wide dissemination was in response to Senate Bill 266, authored by Senators Biden and DeConcini, which demanded that "...communications systems permit the government to obtain the plain text contents of voice, data, and other communications...". WikiLeaks is an example of a politically motivated website: it seeks to "keep governments open".
 Mirroring: Website mirroring is used as a circumvention tool in order to bypass various censorship blocks on websites. This technique copies the contents of a censored website and disseminates it on other domains and sub-domains that are not censored. Document mirroring, similar to website mirroring, is a technique that focuses on backing up various documents and other works. RECAP is software that was written with the purpose to 'liberate US case law' and make it openly available online. The software project takes the form of distributed document collection and archival. Major mirroring projects include initiatives such as the Internet Archive and Wikisource. 
 Anonymity: A method of speaking out to a wide audience about human rights issues, government oppression, etc. that utilizes various web tools such as free and/or disposable email accounts, IP masking, and blogging software to preserve a high level of anonymity.
 Doxing: The practice in which private and/or confidential documents and records are hacked into and made public. Hacktivists see this as a form of assured transparency, experts claim it is harassment. 
 Denial-of-service attacks: These attacks, commonly referred to as DoS attacks, use large arrays of personal and public computers that hackers take control of via malware executable files usually transmitted through email attachments or website links. After taking control, these computers act like a herd of zombies, redirecting their network traffic to one website, with the intention of overloading servers and taking a website offline.
Virtual sit-ins: Similar to DoS attacks but executed by individuals rather than software, a large number of protesters visit a targeted website and rapidly load pages to overwhelm the site with network traffic to slow the site or take it offline.
Website defacements: Hackers infiltrate a web server to replace a specific web page with one of their own, usually to convey a specific message.
Website redirects: This method involves changing the address of a website within the server so would-be visitors of the site are redirected to a site created by the perpetrator, typically to denounce the original site.
 Geo-bombing: A technique in which netizens add a geo-tag while editing YouTube videos so that the location of the video can be seen in Google Earth.
 Protestware: The use of malware to promote a social cause or protest. Protestware is self-inflicted by a project's maintainer in order to spread a message; most commonly in a disruptive manner. The term was popularized during the Russo-Ukrainian War after the peacenotwar supply chain attack on the npm ecosystem.

Controversy
Depending on who is using the term, hacktivism can be a politically motivated technology hack, a constructive form of anarchic civil disobedience, or an undefined anti-systemic gesture. It can signal anticapitalist or political protest; it can denote anti-spam activists, security experts, or open source advocates.

Some people describing themselves as hacktivists have taken to defacing websites for political reasons, such as attacking and defacing websites of governments and those who oppose their ideology. Others, such as Oxblood Ruffin (the "foreign affairs minister" of Cult of the Dead Cow and Hacktivismo), have argued forcefully against definitions of hacktivism that include web defacements or denial-of-service attacks.

Hacktivism is often seen as shadowy due to its anonymity, commonly attributed to the work of fringe groups and outlying members of society. The lack of responsible parties to be held accountable for the social-media attacks performed by hactivists has created implications in corporate and federal security measures both on and offline.

While some self-described hacktivists have engaged in DoS attacks, critics suggest that DoS attacks are an attack on free speech and that they have unintended consequences. DoS attacks waste resources and they can lead to a "DoS war" that nobody will win. In 2006, Blue Security attempted to automate a DoS attack against spammers; this led to a massive DoS  attack against Blue Security which knocked them, their old ISP and their DNS provider off the Internet, destroying their business.

Following denial-of-service attacks by Anonymous on multiple sites, in reprisal for the apparent suppression of WikiLeaks, John Perry Barlow, a founding member of the EFF, said "I support freedom of expression, no matter whose, so I oppose DDoS attacks regardless of their target... they're the poison gas of cyberspace...".  On the other hand, Jay Leiderman, an attorney for many hacktivists, argues that DDoS can be a legitimate form of protest speech in situations that are reasonably limited in time, place and manner.

Notable hacktivist events

In late 1990s, the Hong Kong Blondes helped Chinese citizens get access to blocked websites by targeting the Chinese computer networks. The group identified holes in the Chinese internet system, particularly in the area of satellite communications. The leader of the group, Blondie Wong, also described plans to attack American businesses that were partnering with China.
In 1996, the title of the United States Department of Justice's homepage was changed to "Department of Injustice". Pornographic images were also added to the homepage to protest the Communications Decency Act.
In 1998, members of the Electronic Disturbance Theater created FloodNet, a web tool that allowed users to participate in DDoS attacks (or what they called electronic civil disobedience) in support of Zapatista rebels in Chiapas.
In December 1998, a hacktivist group from the US called Legions of the Underground emerged. They declared a cyberwar against Iraq and China and planned on disabling internet access in retaliation for the countries' human rights abuses. Opposing hackers criticized this move by Legions of the Underground, saying that by shutting down internet systems, the hacktivist group would have no impact on providing free access to information.
In July 2001, Hacktivismo, a sect of the Cult of the Dead Cow, issued the "Hacktivismo Declaration". This served as a code of conduct for those participating in hacktivism, and declared the hacker community's goals of stopping "state-sponsored censorship of the Internet" as well as affirming the rights of those therein to "freedom of opinion and expression".
 During the 2009 Iranian election protests, Anonymous played a role in disseminating information to and from Iran by setting up the website Anonymous Iran; they also released a video manifesto to the Iranian government.
 Google worked with engineers from SayNow and Twitter to provide communications for the Egyptian people in response to the government sanctioned Internet blackout during the 2011 protests. The result, Speak To Tweet, was a service in which voicemail left by phone was then tweeted via Twitter with a link to the voice message on Google's SayNow.
On Saturday 29 May 2010 a hacker calling himself ‘Kaka Argentine’ hacked into the Ugandan State House website and posted a conspicuous picture of Adolf Hitler with the swastika, a Nazi Party symbol.
 During the Egyptian Internet black out, January 28 – February 2, 2011, Telecomix provided dial up services, and technical support for the Egyptian people. Telecomix released a video stating their support of the Egyptian people, describing their efforts to provide dial-up connections, and offering methods to avoid internet filters and government surveillance. The hacktivist group also announced that they were closely tracking radio frequencies in the event that someone was sending out important messages.
 Project Chanology, also known as "Operation Chanology", was a hacktivist protest against the Church of Scientology to punish the church for participating in Internet censorship relating to the removal of material from a 2008 interview with Church of Scientology member Tom Cruise. Hacker group Anonymous attempted to "expel the church from the Internet" via DDoS attacks. In February 2008 the movement shifted toward legal methods of nonviolent protesting. Several protests were held as part of Project Chanology, beginning in 2008 and ending in 2009.
On June 3, 2011, LulzSec took down a website of the FBI. This was the first time they had targeted a website that was not part of the private sector. That week, the FBI was able to track the leader of LulzSec, Hector Xavier Monsegur.
On June 20, 2011 LulzSec targeted the Serious Organised Crime Agency of the United Kingdom, causing UK authorities to take down the website.
In August 2011 a member of Anonymous working under the name "Oliver Tucket" took control of the Syrian Defense Ministry website and added an Israeli government web portal in addition to changing the mail server for the website to one belonging to the Chinese navy.
 Anonymous and New World Hackers claimed responsibility for the 2016 Dyn cyberattack in retaliation for Ecuador's rescinding Internet access to WikiLeaks founder Julian Assange at their embassy in London. WikiLeaks alluded to the attack. Subsequently, FlashPoint stated that the attack was most likely done by script kiddies.
 In 2013, as an online component to the Million Mask March, Anonymous in the Philippines crashed 30 government websites and posted a YouTube video to congregate people in front of the parliament house on November 5 to demonstrate their disdain toward the Filipino government.  
 In 2014, Sony Pictures Entertainment was hacked by a group by the name of Guardians Of Peace (GOP) who obtained over 100 Terabytes of data including unreleased films, employee salary, social security data, passwords, and account information. GOP hacked various social media accounts and hijacked them by changing their passwords to diespe123 (die  pictures entertainment) and posting threats on the pages.
 In 2016, Turkish programmer Azer Koçulu removed his software package, left-pad from npm, causing a cascading failure of other software packages that contained left-pad as a dependency. This was done after Kik, a messaging application, threatened legal action against Koçulu after he refused to rename his kik package. npm ultimately sided with Kik, prompting Koçulu to unpublish all of his packages from npm in protest, including left-pad.

 British hacker Kane Gamble, who was sentenced to 2 years in youth detention, posed as John Brennan, the then director of the CIA, and Mark F. Giuliano, a former deputy director of the FBI, to access highly sensitive information. The judge said Gamble engaged in "politically motivated cyber-terrorism."

 In 2021, Anonymous hacked and leaked the databases of American web hosting company Epik.

 As a response against 2022 Russian invasion of Ukraine, Anonymous performed multiple cyberattacks against Russian computer systems.

Notable hacktivist people/groups

WikiLeaks

WikiLeaks was founded in 2006 by Julian Assange as a "multi-national media organization and associated library." WikiLeaks operated under the principle of "principled leaking," in order to fight societal corruption. The not-for-profit functions as a whistleblowing organization that serves as an archive of classified documents. Originally, WikiLeaks was operated with the principles of a wiki site, meaning that users could post documents, edit others' documents, and help decide which materials were posted.

The first notable release of documents by WikiLeaks was the release of Afghanistan War logs. In July 2010, WikiLeaks published over 90,000 documents regarding the war in Afghanistan. Prior to the leak, WikiLeaks gave access to the documents to three newspapers. Though WikiLeaks did not identify a source for the documents, it was speculated that the leak came from Chelsea Manning, a U.S. Army intelligence analyst arrested in May 2010 and accused of leaking classified information. The war logs revealed 144 incidents of formerly unreported civilian casualties by the U.S. military. The leak of the Afghanistan war logs was the greatest military leak in United States history.

WikiLeaks is also notable for its leak of over 20,000 confidential emails and 8,000 file attachments from the Democratic National Committee (DNC), on July 22, 2016. The emails are specifically from the inboxes of seven prominent staffers of the DNC, and they were leaked as a searchable database. The emails leaked showed instances of key DNC staffers working to undermine Senator Bernie Sanders' presidential campaign prior to primary elections, which was directly against the DNC's stated neutrality in primary elections. Examples of targeting Senator Bernie Sanders included targeting his religion, hoping for his dropping out of the race, constructing negative narratives about his campaign and more. Other emails revealed criticism of President Barack Obama for not helping more in fundraising. Following the leak, DNC chairwoman Debbie Wasserman Schultz announced she would be stepping down from her position in the DNC. On July 25, 2016, the Democratic National Convention opened without Wasserman Schultz. The DNC issued an apology to Sanders the same day the Democratic National Convention opened.

Anonymous

Perhaps the most prolific and well known hacktivist group, Anonymous has been prominent and prevalent in many major online hacks over the past decade. Anonymous originated on the forums of 4chan during 2003, but didn't rise to prominence until 2008 when they directly attacked the Church of Scientology in a massive DoS attack. Since then, Anonymous has participated in a great number of online projects such as Operation: Payback and Operation: Safe Winter. However, while a great number of their projects have been for a charitable cause, they have still gained notoriety from the media due to the nature of their work mostly consisting of illegal hacking.

Following the Paris terror attacks in 2015, Anonymous posted a video declaring war on ISIS, the terror group that claimed responsibility for the attacks. Since declaring war on ISIS, Anonymous since identified several Twitter accounts associated with the movement in order to stop the distribution of ISIS propaganda. However, Anonymous fell under heavy criticism when Twitter issued a statement calling the lists Anonymous had compiled "wildly inaccurate," as it contained accounts of journalists and academics rather than members of ISIS.

Anonymous has also been involved with the Black Lives Matter movement. Early in July 2015, there was a rumor circulating that Anonymous was calling for a Day of Rage protests in retaliation for the shootings of Alton Sterling and Philando Castile, which would entail violent protests and riots. This rumor was based on a video that was not posted with the official Anonymous YouTube account. None of the Twitter accounts associated with Anonymous had tweeted anything in relation to a Day of Rage, and the rumors were identical to past rumors that had circulated in 2014 following the death of Mike Brown. Instead, on July 15, a Twitter account associated with Anonymous posted a series of tweets calling for a day of solidarity with the Black Lives Matter movement. The Twitter account used the hashtag "#FridayofSolidarity" to coordinate protests across the nation, and emphasized the fact that the Friday of Solidarity was intended for peaceful protests. The account also stated that the group was unaware of any Day of Rage plans.

In February 2017 the group took down more than 10,000 sites on the Dark web related to child porn.

DkD[|| 
DkD[||, a French cyberhacktivist, was known, amongst others, to be the "defacer" of navy.mil (US Navy website) and defensivethinking.com (the Company of the famous hacker Kevin Mitnick) among other 2000 websites.

He had been arrested by the OCLCTIC (office central de lutte contre la criminalité liée aux technologies de l’information et de la communication), in March 2003.

DkD[|| defaced more than 2000 pages, many were governments and US military sites.

Eric Voulleminot of the Regional Service of Judicial Police in Lille classified the young hacker as "the most wanted hacktivist in france"

DkD[|| was a very known defacer in the underground for his political view, doing his defacements for various political reasons. In response to his arrest, The Ghost Boys defaced many  sites using the “Free DkD[||!!” slogan.

LulzSec

In May 2011, five members of Anonymous formed the hacktivist group Lulz Security, otherwise known as LulzSec. LulzSec's name originated from the conjunction of the internet slang term "lulz", meaning laughs, and "sec", meaning security. The group members used specific handles to identify themselves on Internet Relay Channels, the most notable being:  "Sabu," "Kayla," "T-Flow," "Topiary," "AVUnit," and "Pwnsauce." Though the members of LulzSec would spend up to 20 hours a day in communication, they did not know one another personally, nor did they share personal information. For example, once the members' identities were revealed, "T-Flow" was revealed to be 15 years old. Other members, on the basis of his advanced coding ability, thought he was around 30 years old.

One of the first notable targets that LulzSec pursued was HBGary, which was performed in response to a claim made by the technology security company that it had identified members of Anonymous. Following this, the members of LulzSec targeted an array of companies and entities, including but not limited to: Fox Television, Tribune Company, PBS, Sony, Nintendo, and the Senate.gov website. The targeting of these entities typically involved gaining access to and downloading confidential user information, or defacing the website at hand.  LulzSec while not as strongly political as those typical of WikiLeaks or Anonymous, they shared similar sentiments for the freedom of information. One of their distinctly politically driven attacks involved targeting the Arizona State Police in response to new immigration laws.

The group's first attack that garnered significant government attention was in 2011, when they collectively took down a website of the FBI. Following the incident, the leader of LulzSec, "Sabu," was identified as Hector Xavier Monsegur by the FBI, and he was the first of the group to be arrested. Immediately following his arrest, Monsegur admitted to criminal activity. He then began his cooperation with the US government, helping FBI authorities to arrest 8 of his co-conspirators, prevent 300 potential cyber attacks, and helped to identify vulnerabilities in existing computer systems. In August 2011, Monsegur pleaded guilty to "computer hacking conspiracy, computer hacking, computer hacking in furtherance of fraud, conspiracy to commit access device fraud, conspiracy to commit bank fraud, and aggravated identity theft pursuant to a cooperation agreement with the government." He served a total of one year and seven months and was charged a $1,200 fine.

Related practices

Culture jamming 
Hacking has been sometime described as a form of culture jamming. This term refers to the practice of subverting and criticizing political messages as well as media culture with the aim of challenging the status quo. It is often targeted toward subliminal thought processes taking place in the viewers with the goal of raising awareness as well as causing a paradigm shift. Culture jamming takes many forms including billboard hacking, broadcast signal intrusion, ad hoc art performances, simulated legal transgressions, memes, and artivism.

The term "culture jamming" was first coined in 1984 by American musician Donald Joyce of the band Negativland. However, some speculation remains as to when the practice of culture jamming first began. Social researcher Vince Carducci believes culture jamming can be traced back to the 1950s with European social activist group Situationist International. Author and cultural critic Mark Dery believes medieval carnival is the earliest form of culture jamming as a way to subvert the social hierarchy at the time.

Culture jamming is sometimes confused with acts of vandalism. However, unlike culture jamming, the main goal of vandalism is to cause destruction with any political themes being of lesser importance. Artivism usually has the most questionable nature as a form of culture jamming because defacement of property is usually involved.

Media hacking
Media hacking refers to the usage of various electronic media in an innovative or otherwise abnormal fashion for the purpose of conveying a message to as large a number of people as possible, primarily achieved via the World Wide Web. A popular and effective means of media hacking is posting on a blog, as one is usually controlled by one or more independent individuals, uninfluenced by outside parties. The concept of social bookmarking, as well as Web-based Internet forums, may cause such a message to be seen by users of other sites as well, increasing its total reach.

Media hacking is commonly employed for political purposes, by both political parties and political dissidents. A good example of this is the 2008 US Election, in which both the Democratic and Republican parties used a wide variety of different media in order to convey relevant messages to an increasingly Internet-oriented audience. At the same time, political dissidents used blogs and other social media like Twitter in order to reply on an individual basis to the presidential candidates. In particular, sites like Twitter are proving important means in gauging popular support for the candidates, though the site is often used for dissident purposes rather than a show of positive support.

Mobile technology has also become subject to media hacking for political purposes. SMS has been widely used by political dissidents as a means of quickly and effectively organising smart mobs for political action. This has been most effective in the Philippines, where SMS media hacking has twice had a significant impact on whether or not the country's Presidents are elected or removed from office.

Reality hacking
Reality hacking is any phenomenon that emerges from the nonviolent use of illegal or legally ambiguous digital tools in pursuit of politically, socially, or culturally subversive ends. These tools include website defacements, URL redirections, denial-of-service attacks, information theft, web-site parodies, virtual sit-ins, and virtual sabotage.

Art movements such as Fluxus and Happenings in the 1970s created a climate of receptibility in regard to loose-knit organizations and group activities where spontaneity, a return to primitivist behavior, and an ethics where activities and socially engaged art practices became tantamount to aesthetic concerns.

The conflation of these two histories in the mid-to-late 1990s  resulted in cross-overs between virtual sit-ins, electronic civil disobedience, denial-of-service attacks, as well as mass protests in relation to groups like the International Monetary Fund and the World Bank. The rise of collectives, net.art groups, and those concerned with the fluid interchange of technology and real life (often from an environmental concern) gave birth to the practice of "reality hacking".

Reality hacking relies on tweaking the everyday communications most easily available to individuals with the purpose of awakening the political and community conscience of the larger population. The term first came into use among New York and San Francisco artists, but has since been adopted by a school of political activists centered around culture jamming.

In fiction
The 1999 science fiction-action film The Matrix, among others, popularized the simulation hypothesis — the suggestion that reality is in fact a simulation of which those affected by the simulants are generally unaware. In this context, "reality hacking" is reading and understanding the code which represents the activity of the simulated reality environment (such as Matrix digital rain) and also modifying it in order to bend the laws of physics or otherwise modify the simulated reality.

Reality hacking as a mystical practice is explored in the Gothic-Punk aesthetics-inspired White Wolf urban fantasy role-playing game Mage: The Ascension. In this game, the Reality Coders (also known as Reality Hackers or Reality Crackers) are a faction within the Virtual Adepts, a secret society of mages whose magick revolves around digital technology. They are dedicated to bringing the benefits of cyberspace to real space. To do this, they had to identify, for lack of a better term, the "source code" that allows our Universe to function. And that is what they have been doing ever since. Coders infiltrated a number of levels of society in order to gather the greatest compilation of knowledge ever seen. One of the Coders' more overt agendas is to acclimate the masses to the world that is to come. They spread Virtual Adept ideas through video games and a whole spate of "reality shows" that mimic virtual reality far more than "real" reality. The Reality Coders consider themselves the future of the Virtual Adepts, creating a world in the image of visionaries like Grant Morrison or Terence McKenna.

In a location-based game (also known as a pervasive game), reality hacking refers to tapping into phenomena that exist in the real world, and tying them into the game story universe.

Academic interpretations 
There have been various academic approaches to deal with hacktivism and urban hacking. In 2010, Günther Friesinger, Johannes Grenzfurthner and Thomas Ballhausen published an entire reader dedicated to the subject. They state: "Urban spaces became battlefields, signifiers have been invaded, new structures have been established: Netculture replaced counterculture in most parts and also focused on the everchanging environments of the modern city. Important questions have been brought up to date and reasked, taking current positions and discourses into account. The major question still remains, namely how to create culturally based resistance under the influence of capitalistic pressure and conservative politics."

See also

 Crypto-anarchism
 Cyberterrorism
 E-democracy
 Open-source governance
 Patriotic hacking
 Tactical media
 1984 Network Liberty Alliance
 Chaos Computer Club
 Cicada 3301
 Decocidio
 Jester
 Internet vigilantism
 The Internet's Own Boy: The Story of Aaron Swartz – a documentary film
 milw0rm
 2600: The Hacker Quarterly
 Citizen Lab
 HackThisSite
 Cypherpunk
 Jeremy Hammond
 Mr. Robot – a television series

References

Further reading
 
 Olson, Parmy. (05-14-2013). We Are Anonymous: Inside the Hacker World of LulzSec, Anonymous, and the Global Cyber Insurgency. .
 Coleman, Gabriella. (2014-11-4). Hacker, Hoaxer, Whistleblower, Spy: The Many Faces of Anonymous. Verso Books. . 
 Shantz, Jeff; Tomblin, Jordon (2014-11-28). Cyber Disobedience: Re://Presenting Online Anarchy. John Hunt Publishing. .

Deseriis, Marco (2017). Hacktivism: On the Use of Botnets in Cyberattacks. Theory, Culture & Society 34(4): 131–152.

External links
 Hacktivism and Politically Motivated Computer Crime History, types of activity and cases studies

Activism by type
Hacking (computer security)

Politics and technology
Internet terminology
2000s neologisms
Culture jamming techniques
Hacker culture
Articles containing video clips